Dominique Gonnet (born in 1950) is a Jesuit professor and a researcher at Institut des sources chrétiennes. He is a founding member of the Société d'Études Syriaques and has co-edited, in its collection of studies, Les Pères grecs dans la tradition syriaque.

Biography 
Gonnet was born in 1950 in Belgium.

Education 
In 1970, Gonnet graduated in Classics at the University of Lille. In 1971, Gonnet earned a CAPES in Classical Letters, and then, from 1976, a master's degree in linguistics. He studied at the Hebrew University of Jerusalem (1972-1973) and He entered the Society of Jesus in 1973. From 1993, Gonnet holds a ThD at Centre Sèvres, with his thesis La liberté religieuse à Vatican II : la contribution de John Courtney Murray, SJ.

Teaching 
Since 1992 he has worked at the Institut des Sources Chrétiennes in Lyon as a research engineer associated with the Unité Mixte de Recherche HiSoMA (Histoire et Sources des Mondes Antiques, CNRS-Université Lyon 2). Gonnet has been teaching Syriac since 1993 for the University of Lyon 2. He is a Student chaplain and theology teacher in Aix and Toulon (in 1990). He also leads a Syriac seminar by videoconference at Sources Chrétiennes, which allows for further study of the language and literature.

Writings 
Gonnes is author of several articles in the Syriac field. In the same collection, he published an article in The New Testament in Syriac as well as several others concerning different Syriac authors from Ephrem to Bar Hebraeus. With Jean Pflieger, he finalized the French translation of J. Healey's manual.

Since 1992 he has worked at the Institut des Sources Chrétiennes in Lyon as a research engineer associated with the Unité Mixte de Recherche HiSoMA (Histoire et Sources des Mondes Antiques, CNRS-Université Lyon 2).

Works

Thesis

Books

Articles

References 

1950 births
Living people
20th-century French historians
21st-century French historians
French Hebraists